Vietteilus borbonica is a moth of the family Pterophoridae that is known from La Réunion and Tanzania.

References
Viette, P. 1957c. Lépidoptères (excepté les Tordeuses et les Géométrides). – In: La Faune entomologique de l'Ile de la Réunion. I. - Mémoires de l'Institut scientifique de Madagascar (E)8:137–226; pls. 1–4.

Pterophorinae
Moths described in 1957
Taxa named by Pierre Viette
Moths of Africa